Carter Finally Gets It is a 2009 young adult novel by Brent Crawford. The novel follows the misadventures of William Carter, who has ADD, as he enters his first year of high school. He must face bullies, rejection, and going to the  same school as his sister. It won't be easy, especially when his friends start having more fun than him. But he makes it through eventually.

Reception

Critics gave generally positive reviews to the Crawford's first novel.  The School Library Journal said "Crawford's debut is hysterical from start to finish." While Booklist commented "[Crawford’s] stream-of-consciousness, first-person narrative flails around in an excellent imitation of a freshman, complete with volume changes, dumb jokes, and sudden flashes of elation and despair. Occasionally poignant and frequently hilarious."

References

2009 American novels
American young adult novels
Books about attention deficit hyperactivity disorder
2009 debut novels